Cinema and the Swastika: The International Expansion of Third Reich Cinema is a 2007 book published by Palgrave Macmillan and edited by Roel Vande Winkel and David Welch.

References

2007 non-fiction books
History books about Nazi Germany
Palgrave Macmillan books